The 2018 Tata Open Maharashtra was a 2018 ATP World Tour tennis tournament played on outdoor hard courts. It was the 23rd edition of the only ATP tournament played in India and took place in Pune, India, from 1 January through 6 January 2018. It was the first edition of the tournament to be held after it was moved from Chennai to Pune.

Points and prize money

Point distribution

Prize money

ATP singles main-draw entrants

Seeds

1 Rankings as of 25 December 2017

Other entrants 
The following players received wildcards into the singles main draw:
  Arjun Kadhe
  Benoît Paire
  Ramkumar Ramanathan

The following players received entry using a protected ranking:
  Pablo Andújar

The following players received entry from the qualifying draw:
  Ilya Ivashka
  Thiago Monteiro
  Sumit Nagal
  Ricardo Ojeda Lara

Withdrawals 
Before the tournament
  Jérémy Chardy →replaced by  Pablo Andújar
  Rogério Dutra Silva →replaced by  Marco Cecchinato
  Ivo Karlović →replaced by  Yuki Bhambri
  Lukáš Lacko →replaced by  Roberto Carballés Baena
  Lu Yen-hsun →replaced by  Ruben Bemelmans

Retirements 
  Thiago Monteiro

ATP doubles main-draw entrants

Seeds 

 1 Rankings are as of 25 December 2017.

Other entrants 
The following pairs received wildcards into the doubles main draw:
  Sriram Balaji /  Vishnu Vardhan
  Arjun Kadhe /  Benoît Paire

Finals

Singles 

  Gilles Simon defeated  Kevin Anderson, 7–6(7–4), 6–2

Doubles 

  Robin Haase /  Matwé Middelkoop defeated  Pierre-Hugues Herbert /  Gilles Simon, 7–6(7–5), 7–6(7–5)

References

External links 
Official website

 
Maharashtra Open
Sports competitions in Pune
Tata Open Maharashtra
Maharashtra
Tata Open Maharashtra